Tail O’ the Pup is an iconic Los Angeles, California hot dog stand actually shaped like a hot dog. Built in 1946, the small, walk-up stand has been noted as a prime example of "programmatic" or "mimetic" novelty architecture. It was one of the last surviving mid-20th century buildings that were built in the shapes of the products they sold.

History
Designed by architect Milton Black, the stand opened at 311 La Cienega Boulevard in June 1946 to luminary-studded, searchlight-lit fanfare. Eddie Blake purchased the Pup in 1976 from its celebrity owners, the dance team of Veloz and Yolanda.

Despite its appearance in countless movies, television programs and commercials, the stand faced demolition in the mid-1980s, creating an outcry that resulted in the stand being moved a couple of blocks from its original location at 311 North La Cienega Boulevard to 329 North San Vicente Boulevard.

The hot dog stand closed in December 2005. The structure was moved into a Torrance warehouse after Regent Properties, a development company, purchased the Pup's site from landlord Cedars-Sinai Medical Center, and announced plans to build 152 condominium and apartment units.

The City of Los Angeles in 2006 declared Tail O’ the Pup to be a cultural landmark.

Blake's grandson Jay Miller and his wife Nicole inherited the Pup in 2017. After a failed attempt to have it reopened in a partnership with Killer Shrimp, the structure was donated to the Valley Relics Museum.

The 1933 Group purchased the structure in 2018 with plans to restore the stand to its original appearance, find a new location, and reopen it.

The stand reopened in July 2022 in West Hollywood.

See also

 Coney Island Hot Dog Stand
 Randy’s Donuts

References

External links

 The Tail o' the Pup image
 The Tail o' the Pup image via: Taschen, CNN 
 The Tail o' the Pup image via: CityNews Calgary

1946 establishments in California
2006 disestablishments in California
Hot dog restaurants in the United States
Landmarks in Los Angeles
Novelty buildings in California
Restaurants disestablished in 2006
Restaurants established in 1946
Restaurants in Los Angeles